Scopula sinnaria is a moth of the family Geometridae first described by Charles Swinhoe in 1904. It is found in Angola, Kenya, Lesotho, Malawi, South Africa and Zimbabwe.

Subspecies
Scopula sinnaria sinnaria (South Africa)
Scopula sinnaria bisinuata (Warren, 1905) (Angola)

References

Moths described in 1904
sinnaria
Moths of Africa